Molybdopterin adenylyltransferase (MogA, Cnx1) is an enzyme with systematic name ATP:molybdopterin adenylyltransferase. This enzyme catalyses the following chemical reaction

 ATP + molybdopterin  diphosphate + adenylyl-molybdopterin

This enzyme catalyses the activation of molybdopterin for molybdenum insertion.

References

External links 

EC 2.7.7